Deh Dalian (also Romanized as Deh Dalīān, Deh Delīān, and Deh Delyān) is a village in Sangestan Rural District, in the Central District of Hamadan County, Hamadan Province, Iran. At the 2006 census, its population was 339, in 87 families.

References 

Populated places in Hamadan County